Kalpana (18 July 1946 – 4 January 2012), born Archana Mohan, was an Indian actress who worked in Hindi cinema in the 1960s. She appeared with Shammi Kapoor in the 1962 film Professor, with Shashi Kapoor and Kishore Kumar in Pyar Kiye Jaa (1966), with Dev Anand in Teen Devian, with Pradeep Kumar in Saheli and with Feroz Khan in Tasveer and Teesra Kaun. Daughter of revolutionary Avani Mohan, she was also an accomplished Kathak dancer trained under Pandit Shambhu Maharaj. She lived in Pune with her family. She lived for some time in Ambala Cantt. For some years she went to a school in Ambala Cantt. Her father was working in Khadi and village Industries Commission in the state office situated on Nicklson road in Ambala Cant during 1962-63.

Early life
Kalpana Mohan was born as Archana Mohan in Srinagar on 18 July 1946. She is of Panjabi and Dogra descent. Her father, Avani Mohan, a freedom fighter and an active member of the All India Congress Committee, was close to Pandit Jawaharlal Nehru and other top Congress stalwarts. She was trained in Kathak and often invited by Nehru to dance at the Rashtrapati Bhavan whenever dignitaries visited.

Career 
Kalpana was spotted by actor Balraj Sahani and Urdu writer Ismat Chughtai, who encouraged her to come to Mumbai. Kalpana's first film, Pyaar Ki Jeet, lasted a week in theatres. Her second film was Naughty Boy (1962). Her third film, Professor, released in 1962 was a rare entertainer, which left the viewers delighted and satisfied. It starred Shammi Kapoor, who earned a Filmfare nomination as Best Actor. In 1965, she had another successful film, Teen Devian, with Dev Anand. Her next film, the comedy Pyar Kiye Jaa came out in 1966. Kalpana also starred in Biwi aur Makan opposite Biswajit in 1966. She had a brief but successful stint in Bollywood in the 60's and 70's but stopped after she got married. Some of her last films were Saheli (1965), Picnic (1966), Tasveer (1966) and Nawab Siraj ud Daula in 1967.

Filmography

Personal life 
Kalpana was married twice. In the mid-1960s, she married and quickly divorced screenwriter and film director Sachin Bhowmick. In 1967, she married an Indian Navy officer, with whom she had her only daughter. She divorced him in 1972. Despite raising her daughter alone, she made sure to give her best education as possible. She continued to live in Mumbai for a while but stopped acting to take care of her daughter. She moved to Kalyani Nagar in the eastern region of Pune in the early 1990s and spent her remaining life there after doctors advised a cleaner climate for her health. Her daughter married and moved to the United States with her husband. Kalpana lived by herself in Pune and her health started deteriorating.

Death 
In 2011, she had lodged a complaint at a Khadak police station in Pune stating three people had allegedly made a fake memorandum of understanding by forging her signature. She alleged that they then sold her  plot of land she owned in Mauje Visagar village to Sahara City builders in 2007 with her forged signature. The stress over this matter weakened her health even more.

Her daughter and son-in-law came from the US to take care of her as she was in treatment for cancer and suffered from a bout of pneumonia. She died at the age of 65 in the early hours of 4 January 2012 at the Pune Hospital and Research Centre due to cancer. She is survived by her daughter Preeti Mansukhani, son-in-law Harish and grandchildren Yash and Khushi. Her final rites were performed at the Vaikunth crematorium amidst family and close friends. The news of her death was brought to public several days later as her family knew that many people had their eye on her property.

References

1946 births
2012 deaths
Actresses in Hindi cinema
Actresses from Pune
Indian film actresses
20th-century Indian actresses